This is a list of species in the genus Cremastocheilus, anteater scarab beetles.

Species

 Cremastocheilus academicus Krikken, 1982
 Cremastocheilus angularis Leconte, 1857
 Cremastocheilus armatus Walker, 1866
 Cremastocheilus beameri Cazier, 1940
 Cremastocheilus canaliculatus Kirby, 1827
 Cremastocheilus castaneae Knoch, 1801
 Cremastocheilus chapini Cazier, 1940
 Cremastocheilus congener Casey, 1915
 Cremastocheilus constricollis Cazier, 1940
 Cremastocheilus constricticollis Cazier, 1940
 Cremastocheilus crinitus Leconte, 1874
 Cremastocheilus depressus Leconte, 1863
 Cremastocheilus excavatus Cazier, 1940
 Cremastocheilus harrisii Kirby, 1827
 Cremastocheilus hirsutus Van Dyke, 1918
 Cremastocheilus knochii Leconte, 1853
 Cremastocheilus lengi Cazier, 1940
 Cremastocheilus maritimus Casey, 1915
 Cremastocheilus mentalis Cazier, 1940
 Cremastocheilus mexicanus Schaum, 1841
 Cremastocheilus nitens Leconte, 1853
 Cremastocheilus opaculus Horn, 1894
 Cremastocheilus planatus Leconte, 1863
 Cremastocheilus planipes Horn, 1885
 Cremastocheilus pulverulentus Cazier, 1940
 Cremastocheilus puncticollis Cazier, 1940
 Cremastocheilus quadratus Fall, 1912
 Cremastocheilus quadricollis (Casey, 1915)
 Cremastocheilus retractus Leconte, 1874
 Cremastocheilus robinsoni Cazier, 1940
 Cremastocheilus saucius Leconte, 1858
 Cremastocheilus schaumii LeConte, 1853
 Cremastocheilus setosifrons (Casey, 1915)
 Cremastocheilus spinifer Horn, 1885
 Cremastocheilus squamulosus Leconte, 1858
 Cremastocheilus stathamae Cazier, 1961
 Cremastocheilus tomentosus Warner, 1985
 Cremastocheilus variolosus Kirby, 1826
 Cremastocheilus westwoodi Horn, 1880
 Cremastocheilus wheeleri LeConte, 1876

References